Castres XIII Rugby League Knights are a French Rugby league club based in Castres in the French region of Tarn, Midi-Pyrenees. Founded in 2013 they play in the National Division 2 Midi-Pyrenees regional league.

History 

The club was formed in 2013 to introduce Rugby league to the area, specifically to school children. The club runs both junior and ladies teams.

See also 
 National Division 2

External links 

 club website

2013 establishments in France
French rugby league teams
Rugby clubs established in 2013